The Albany Herald is the daily newspaper for metro Albany in the U.S. state of Georgia. It is distributed in metro Albany and in southwest Georgia. The newspaper was founded in 1891. Circulation is 21,701 on weekdays and 24,820 on Sundays. Offices for the paper were previously housed in the historic Rosenberg Brothers Department Store in downtown Albany.

History
The Herald Publishing Company, a company founded in 1897, was purchased by James H. Gray in 1946 after he returned from World War II. The Albany Herald would become the flagship newspaper of Gray Communications Systems (now Gray Television).

In 1993, The Herald converted to a morning publication to serve better the needs of southwest Georgia.

In 2005 Gray's newspaper holdings were spun off into a separate company which was named Triple Crown Media.  Triple Crown Media changed its name to Southern Community Newspapers Incorporated in 2010.

The Herald announced in October 2012 that it would cease its printing operation in Albany and cut 26 jobs. The paper is printed by Gannett Company at the Tallahassee Democrat.

In May 2017, The Herald switched to a paid subscription website. Full access to The Heralds website is free with the paid subscription to the print newspaper.

The Herald introduced a new weekend edition in October 2017 which is delivered Sunday mornings. The new edition combines the Saturday and Sunday papers, and include more pages, new features and additional color comics.

In March 2018, Scot Morrissey was named the new publisher of The Herald. Morrissey was previously the publisher of the Athens Banner-Herald for nearly 10 years.

After more than three decades in the historic Rosenberg Brothers Department Store building, the paper moved to a smaller office on W Broad Ave. December 2019. The building, and several adjacent buildings, were sold to the city of Albany for $850,000 in April 2019.

References

Newspapers published in Georgia (U.S. state)
Publications established in 1891
Mass media in Albany, Georgia